Thomas Joseph Connolly (July 18, 1922 – April 24, 2015) was an American prelate of the Catholic Church. He served as bishop of the Diocese of Baker in Oregon from 1971 to 1999.

Biography

Early life 
Connolly was born in Tonopah, Nevada, to John and Katherine (née Hammel) Connolly. He completed his studies for the priesthood in California, first at St. Joseph Preparatory Seminary in Mountain View and then at St. Patrick Seminary in Menlo Park.

Priesthood 
Connolly was ordained a priest for the Diocese of Reno by Bishop Thomas Gorman on April 8, 1947. His first assignments were as a curate at the St. Thomas Aquinas Cathedral Parish and at Little Flower Parish, while teaching at Bishop Manogue High School in Reno and serving as chaplain to the local Serra Club.

Connolly served as private secretary to Gorman from 1948 until 1949, when he was sent to study canon law at the Catholic University of America in Washington, D.C. He earned a Licentiate of Canon Law in 1951, and a doctorate from the Pontifical Lateran University in Rome in 1952. Following his return to Reno, Connolly became an assistant pastor at St. Thomas Aquinas Cathedral. After serving at St. Joseph Parish in Elko, Nevada, and St. Albert the Great Church in Reno, he became pastor of St. Teresa of Avila Parish in Carson City, Nevada, from 1968 to 1971.

Bishop of Baker 
On May 4, 1971 Connolly was appointed bishop of the Diocese of Baker by Pope Paul VI. He received his episcopal ordination on June 30, 1971, from Archbishop Robert Dwyer, with Bishops Gorman and Michael Green serving as co-consecrators. In accord with the reforms of the Second Vatican Council, Connolly established a priests' council, an annual presbyteral assembly, a sisters' council, and a diocesan pastoral council with lay participation. He oversaw a large-scale renovation of St. Francis de Sales Cathedral in the early 1980s. He also scheduled regular Masses in Spanish, established a program to assist undocumented immigrants to apply for citizenship, and ordained the first class of permanent deacons for the diocese.

Retirement and legacy 
Upon reaching the mandatory retirement age of 75, Connolly submitted his letter of resignation to Pope John Paul II in July 1997. His resignation was accepted on November 19, 1999, and Reverend Robert F. Vasa of the Diocese of Lincoln was named as his successor. Thomas Connolly died in April 2015, at age 92.

References

1922 births
2015 deaths
People from Tonopah, Nevada
Roman Catholic Diocese of Reno
Roman Catholic bishops of Baker
20th-century Roman Catholic bishops in the United States
Saint Patrick's Seminary and University alumni
Catholic University of America alumni
Religious leaders from Nevada
Catholics from Nevada
American expatriates in Italy